The Berry-Shoalhaven Heads Magpies are an Australian rugby league football team based in Berry, a country town of the South Coast region. The Magpies are a foundation club of the Group 7 Rugby League and are members of Country Rugby League.

History
The Berry-Shoalhaven Heads Magpies have a very rich history in Rugby League in the South Coast. The club was founded in 1914 as a part of South Coast Rugby League along with seven other foundation clubs, three of which still compete in the league, Kiama, Gerringong, and Jamberoo.

The club has been one of the most successful in the league in term of premierships won with 12 overall, only Gerringong having won more (16 titles). They Magpies have also twice completed a hat-trick of first grade premierships (and is currently the only club to have done this). The streaks were from 1935–37 and 1952-54. They again won the premiership in 1966 and 1967, but have not won it since. The Magpies took a brief stint in 2002 out of first grade before returning with vengeance stronger in 2003.
They have made the grand final twice in recent years only to lose at home convincingly by minor premiers, Milton-Ulladulla Bulldogs, 52-10 on home soil in 2004 after winning a mid-week fifth-place playoff to make semifinals. Then again in 2007, the Magpies lost to minor premiers, Albion Park-Oak Flats Eagles 44-10.

More recently, in 2010, the club had a visit by Collingwood president and Channel Nine media personality Eddie McGuire in an effort to link the two Magpie clubs. With McGuire, was other media personality and Collingwood fan Peter Donegan. Former Berry president Michael O'Dwyer worked for Capital TV while they worked for Network Ten in Melbourne, and has since worked closely with the two for several years.

Supporters
Eddie McGuire was presented with a Magpies jumper and has been quoted saying, "my Group 7 team will always be Berry-Shoalhaven Heads".

Colours
The team's colours are black and white and play out of Berry Showground, Berry.

Honours

Team
 Group 7 Rugby League Premierships: 12
 1923, 1926, 1928, 1935, 1936, 1937, 1941, 1952, 1953, 1954, 1966, 1967
 Group 7 Rugby League Runners-Up: 10
 1921, 1922, 1924, 1927, 1948, 1958, 1963, 1964, 2004, 2007
 First Grade Minor Premierships: 8
  1923, 1927, 1936, 1937, 1941, 1952, 1953, 1990
 Group 7 Second Grade Premierships: 1
 2009
 CRL Clayton Cup: None

Individuals
 Michael Cronin Medal: 2
 Brett Herron (1988), Paul Skewes (2007)
 Group 7 Player of the Year: 1
 Jason Berg (1996)
 Rookie of the Year: 1
 Sam Burns (2006)
 Leading Point-scorer of the Year: None

 Leading Try-scorer of the Year: 1
 Matt Gallagher (2008)
 Under-18s Player of the Year: 1
 Nathan Benny (2006)
 Under-21s Player of the Year: 1
 John Walker (1996)
 Kevin Walsh Scholarship: 9
 Brett Stephens (1981), Pat Hayburn (1986), Shane McDermott (1987), Phil Duncan (1993), Nathan Byrne (1994), Scott Monaghan (1995), Ben Byrne (1997), Tim O'Sullivan (1998), Mitchell Liddicoat (2009)

Source: Group 7 History

References

External links
 Berry-Shoalhaven Heads Homepage
 Country Rugby League Homepage
 Country Rugby League
 South Coast Rugby League Homepage

Rugby clubs established in 1914
1914 establishments in Australia
Rugby league teams in New South Wales
South Coast (New South Wales)